Hick's Cayes (Spanish: Cayos Hicks) are a group of uninhabited Islands in the South of Chetumal Bay, between St. George's Caye and Caye Chapel, about halfway between Belize City and San Pedro Town.

Uninhabited islands of Belize
Islands of Belize